Tsukiko is a Japanese feminine given name, and may refer to:
Tsuki Amano
Tsukiko Sagi, a character in Paranoia Agent
Tsukiko, a character in The Order of the Stick webcomic
Tsukiko, a character in The "Hentai" Prince and the Stony Cat

Japanese feminine given names